Lake Albert or Albert Lake may refer to:

 Lake Albert (Africa), one of the African Great Lakes
 Lake Albert (South Australia), a lake
 Lake Albert, South Australia (locality), a locality
 Lake Albert, New South Wales, a suburb of Wagga Wagga, New South Wales
 Lake Albert (New South Wales), a lake located in the suburb of the same name
 Albert Park and Lake, Victoria, Australia
 Albert Lake, Blue Earth County, Minnesota, United States
 Albert Lake (Douglas County, Minnesota)
 Lake Albert (Kingsbury County, South Dakota), a lake in Kingsbury County, South Dakota, U.S. near Badger

See also
 Lake Abert, in the U.S. state of Oregon, previous higher stand called Lake Cheuwaukan